Reality is the fifth mini-album released by the South Korean boy band Infinite. It was released on July 13, 2015, by Woollim Label. The album features seven tracks with "Bad" serving as its title track.

Background
A teaser image for the group's comeback album was revealed on June 30, 2015, on the group's homepage. Thus, confirming that the group would be making a comeback soon. Subsequent images revealing the names of the tracks were also released in the following weeks. On July 2, a representative of Woollim Entertainment confirmed the date of the boy group's comeback to be July 13, 2015, a little over a year since their last album.

Track listing

Charts

Music program awards 
The following is a list of Infinite wins for the song "Bad" on Korea's televised music broadcast shows. The Show is aired on SBS MTV every Tuesday, Show Champion is aired on MBC Music every Wednesday, M! Countdown is on Korean cable channel M.net every Thursday, Music Bank on KBS every Friday and Music Core on MBC every Saturday.

Release history

References

2015 EPs
Infinite (group) EPs
Korean-language EPs
Woollim Entertainment EPs
Kakao M EPs